The women's qualification for the Olympic handball tournament will occur between November 2022 and April 2024, assigning quota places to the twelve squads for the Games: the hosts, the world champion, four continental champions (Africa, Europe, Asia and Oceania, and the Americas), and six teams from the IHF World Olympic qualifying tournaments, respectively.

Summary

Legend

Host country

World Championships

Continental qualification

Europe

Americas

The winner of Pan American Games will directly qualify for Olympics. The Olympic Qualification Tournaments berth will be given to the Pan American Games runner-up.

Asia

Africa

See also
 Handball at the 2024 Summer Olympics – Men's qualification

References

Women's qualification
Handball Women
2022 in women's handball
2023 in women's handball
2024 in women's handball
Olympics